Balanga may refer to:

Balanga, Nigeria, a Local Government Area of Gombe State
Balanga, Bataan, a city in the Philippines
Balanga, another name for tapayan, large wide-mouthed earthenware or stoneware jars in Southeast Asia